Onchidoris derjugini is a species of sea slug, a dorid nudibranch, a shell-less marine gastropod mollusc in the family Onchidorididae.

Distribution
This species was described from the Japan Sea on the Pacific Ocean coast of Russia. The specific name commemorates Konstantin Deryugin.

Description
Millen (1987) considers this species to be poorly described. "It can be distinguished by its undenticulated lateral teeth, larger number of marginal teeth (9 vs. 4-6) and tripinnate gills. These characteristics suggest that Adalaria derjugini is probably a species of Acanthodoris."

References

Onchidorididae
Gastropods described in 1941